Dilba Tanrıkulu (born 8 November 1998) is a Turkish track and field para-athlete competing in the T46 and T47 disability classes sprint and F46 and F47 disability classes long jump events.

Private life
Dilba Tanrıkulu was born to a construction worker father and a housewife mother in Mersin, Turkey on 8 November 1998. She has three siblings. She is disabled at a rate of 30% because her left shoulder nerves were severely 
damaged during her home birth. She completed her secondary education at Mersin Atatürk Vocational High School.

Sports career
She began with athletics in 2010. She is a 
member of a disabled sports club in the neighbor city of Adana. She is coached by Güler Yaşar. 

In 2013, she was admitted to the Turkey national team, and debuted the same year at the IPC Grand Prix held in Grosseto, Italy. She qualified for the 2013 IPC Athletics World Championships with her time of 13.52 exceeding the A-qualification standard for the 2016 Summer Paralympics (AQS) of 13.60, and her distance of 4.78m exceeding the AQS of 4.45m.

References

External links
Dilba Tantıkulu at IPC

1998 births
Living people
Sportspeople from Mersin
Female competitors in athletics with disabilities
Turkish female sprinters
Turkish female long jumpers
21st-century Turkish women